Rafael Pena is a census-designated place (CDP) in Starr County, Texas, United States. This was a new CDP for the 2010 census with a population of 17.

Geography
Rafael Pena is located at  (26.300945, -98.640870).
With a total area of 0.005 square miles it is the smallest CDP of the United States.

References

Census-designated places in Starr County, Texas
Census-designated places in Texas